The rock snail, scientific name Codringtonia codringtonii, is a species of air-breathing land snail, a terrestrial pulmonate gastropod mollusk in the family Helicidae, the typical snails.

Geographic distribution
C. codringtonii is endemic to Greece, where it occurs in the south-western part of the Peloponnese.

References

External links

Codringtonia
Endemic fauna of Greece
Gastropods described in 1834
Taxa named by John Edward Gray
Taxonomy articles created by Polbot